A GI Baby is a child born to a Japanese woman by a military servicemember of the Allied Occupation Forces of Japan.

GI Babies were typically orphans due to the difficulties raising such children, and were also called "mixed orphans". Because the British Federal Occupation Force had taken measures to prohibit dating with non-white women from the viewpoint of racism, the soldiers could not obtain permission to marry a Japanese woman. If it was discovered that a child was born in violation of this, the child was forcibly separated from the family. The ban was abolished in 1952, and hundreds of war brides went to Australia and Britain, but it was reported that in many cases, tragedy still occurred.

Statistics
The Ministry of Health in Japan established Miki Kano on August 13, 1952, consisting of 20 experts Mixed-race child problem countermeasure study group (混血児問題対策研究会). According to the summary of the Kanagawa Prefectural Council of Social Welfare in 1952, there were 276 mixed-breed children in the facility in the prefecture, which was the majority of the mixed-breed children in Japan at that time Child Welfare Facility.

According to a survey conducted by Ministry of Health and Welfare in 1953, there were 4972 GI babies in Japan.  Meanwhile, at that time Elizabeth Saunders Home founder Miki Sawada announced the theory of 200,000 GI babies, but according to a survey by the Pearl S. Buck Foundation, the actual number is very high. Although it is difficult to grasp, it was said that there would actually be at least 20,000 to 30,000 GI babies in Japan at that time.

According to the Diet response to the question of Shinkichi Ukeda in 1959 Koun Takataa (then Director of the Children's Bureau of the Ministry of Health and Welfare), as of 1959, the Ministry of Health and Welfare has counted the number of mixed-breed children in Japan.

Later 
In 2015 is found that the description of the entrance to Negishi Foreign Cemetery, which mentioned GI Babies, was deleted and rewritten by the graveyard manager Yokohama City Hall, and local residents. This explanation was donated to Yokohama City by Yokohama Yamate Lions Club in 1988, and the text was prepared in consultation between Yamate Lions Club and Yokohama City, but in 2000. It was rewritten to. The Yokohama City Environmental Facilities Division does not specify the reason for the rewrite.

People who were born as GI baby 
 Masao Kusakari 草刈正雄
 Makoto Ayukawa 鮎川誠
 Risa Akikawa 秋川リサ
 Fujio Yamaguchi 山口冨士夫
 Michi Aoyama 青山ミチ
 Aki Izumi 泉アキ
 Kacias Naito カシアス内藤
 Helen Nishikawa 西川ヘレン
 Joe Yamanaka ジョー山中
 Rinda Yamamoto 山本リンダ
 Kairakutei Blakku 快楽亭ブラック (2代目)
 Alice Jun 純アリス
 Deni Tamaki 玉城デニー

References 

Aftermath of World War II in Japan
Childhood in Japan
Racism in Japan